Normand Cournoyer (born March 17, 1951) is a Canadian former professional ice hockey player.

During the 1973–74 season, Cournoyer played 13 games with the Cleveland Crusaders, and during the 1976–77 season he played 19 games with the San Diego Mariners, both of the World Hockey Association.

References

External links

1951 births
Living people
Canadian ice hockey centres
Charlotte Checkers (SHL) players
Cleveland Crusaders players
Columbus Golden Seals players
Columbus Owls players
Denver Spurs players
French Quebecers
Sportspeople from Drummondville
Jacksonville Barons players
Macon Whoopees (SHL) players
Muskegon Mohawks players
San Diego Mariners players
San Francisco Shamrocks players
Syracuse Blazers players
Tucson Mavericks players
Verdun Maple Leafs (ice hockey) players
Ice hockey people from Quebec